The Italian Federation of Chemical, Textile, Energy and Manufacturing Workers , FILCTEM) is a trade union representing manufacturing workers in Italy.

The union was founded in October 2009, when the Italian Federation of Chemical, Energy and Manufacturing Workers merged with the Italian Federation of Textile and Garment Workers.  Like its predecessors, it affiliated to the Italian General Confederation of Labour.  It initially had more than 250,000 members.

General Secretaries
2009: Alberto Morselli
2012: Emilio Miceli
2019: Marco Falcinelli

External links

References

Chemical industry in Italy
Manufacturing trade unions
Trade unions established in 2009
Trade unions in Italy